Urocissa is a genus of birds in the Corvidae, a family that contains the crows, jays, and magpies.

The genus was established by German ornithologist Jean Cabanis in 1850. The type species was subsequently designated as the red-billed blue magpie (Urocissa erythroryncha). The name Urocissa combines the Ancient Greek oura meaning "tail" and kissa meaning "magpie" .

The genus contains five species:

Notes

References

External links
 
 

 
Bird genera
Taxa named by Jean Cabanis